Pasquale Russo (born February 28, 1947) is an Italian Camorrista and boss of the Russo clan from Nola, which he co-founded. He has been running the clan together with his brother Salvatore for over thirty years. He has been on the "most wanted list" of the Italian ministry of the Interior since 1995, for Camorra association, murder, concealment of corpse, multiple homicides, racketeering  and other crimes. On February 15, 1996, an international warrant was issued against him, to be arrested for extradition.

Arrest 
He was arrested on November 1, 2009, in Sperone (Avellino) together with his younger brother Carmine Russo, a fugitive since 2007 and on the list of 100 most wanted fugitives. His brother Salvatore had been arrested the day before. He is now serving several life sentences.

Aftermath 
After Pasquale's arrest the Italian police also arrested the businessman Andrea Grandi, accused of hosting Russo for months in one of his houses. However, when questioned in the courtroom, the boss said that he did not know the businessman.

In May 2019, Antonio Russo, Pasquale's son, was arrested. He is accused of extortion.

See also

 List of members of the Camorra
 List of Camorra clans
 Russo clan (Nola)
 Salvatore Russo
 Camorra
 List of most wanted fugitives in Italy
 Alfieri clan

References

1947 births
Living people
People from the Province of Naples
Camorristi sentenced to life imprisonment
Camorristi